Virendra Saini is a double National Film Award winner; the first as a cinematographer, and the second as a director. He has done the cinematography for quite a few acclaimed filmmakers, including Saeed Mirza

Awards and accolades
National Film Award for Best Cinematography, Salim Langde Pe Mat Ro, 1990
National Film Award for Best Children's film, Kabhi Paas Kabhi Fail, 1999

Virendra Saini is one of the 24 reputed filmmakers who returned their National Film Awards in protest against the government.

Filmography

Cinematographer
2000 -  Choo Lenge Akash
1995 - Naseem
1994 - Kabhi Haan Kabhi Naa
1989 - Salim Langde Pe Mat Ro
1986-1987 - Nukkad (TV Series)
1984 - Mohan Joshi Hazir Ho!
1983 - Dhrupad (Documentary)
1981 - Chasm Buddoor
1980 - Albert Pinto Ko Gussa Kyon Ata Hai
1980 - Satah Se Uthata Aadmi
1980 - Sparsh
1978 - Arvind Desai Ki Ajeeb Dustan

Director
2007 - Foto
2000 - Choo Lenge Akash
1999 - Kabhi Paas Kabhi Fail (debut film)
1991 - Goongi Tareekh (TV Series)

Posts Held 
Former director of FTII
Member of the Advisory Board - Kautik International Student Film Festival

References

External links
 Virendra Saini on IMDB
 Virendra Saini on Festival De Cannes
 Virendra Saini on British Film Institute
 Virendra Saini on Children's Film Society of India

Year of birth missing (living people)
Living people
Best Cinematography National Film Award winners